The 2018–19 Boise State Broncos men's basketball team represented Boise State University during the 2018–19 NCAA Division I men's basketball season. The Broncos, led by ninth-year head coach Leon Rice, played their home games at Taco Bell Arena as a member of the Mountain West Conference. They finished the season 13–20, 7–11 in Mountain West play to finish in a three-way tie for seventh place. They defeated Colorado State in the first round of the Mountain West tournament to advance to the quarterfinals where they lost to Nevada. This was the first time in Boise State history that they lost 20 games in a season.

Previous season
The Broncos finished the season 23–9, 13–5 in Mountain West play to finish in second place. They lost in the quarterfinals of the Mountain West tournament to Utah State. They received an invitation to the National Invitation Tournament where they lost in the first round to Washington.

Offseason

Departures

Incoming transfers

2018 recruiting class

Roster

Schedule and results

|-
!colspan=9 style=| Exhibition

|- 
!colspan=9 style=| Non-conference regular season

|-
!colspan=9 style=| Mountain West regular season

|-
!colspan=9 style=| Mountain West tournament

References

Boise State Broncos men's basketball seasons
Boise State
Boise
Boise